is a passenger railway station in located in the town of Katsuragi, Wakayama Prefecture, Japan, operated by West Japan Railway Company (JR West).

Lines
Myōji Station is served by the Wakayama Line, and is located 54.6 kilometers from the terminus of the line at Ōji Station.

Station layout
The station consists of two side platforms connected by a level crossing. The station originally had a side and an island platform, but one side of the island platform is no longer used, and the track has been removed. The station is unattended.

Platforms

Adjacent stations

|-
!colspan=5|West Japan Railway Company

History
Myōji Station opened on November 25, 1900. With the privatization of the Japan National Railways (JNR) on April 1, 1987, the station came under the aegis of the West Japan Railway Company.

Passenger statistics
In fiscal 2019, the station was used by an average of 266 passengers daily (boarding passengers only).

Surrounding Area
 Katsuragi Municipal Myoji Junior High School
 Katsuragi Park

See also
List of railway stations in Japan

References

External links

 Myōji Station Official Site

Railway stations in Wakayama Prefecture
Railway stations in Japan opened in 1900
Katsuragi, Wakayama